Threonine proteases are a family of proteolytic enzymes harbouring a threonine (Thr) residue within the active site. The prototype members of this class of enzymes are the catalytic subunits of the proteasome, however the acyltransferases convergently evolved the same active site geometry and mechanism.

Mechanism

Threonine proteases use the secondary alcohol of their N-terminal threonine as a nucleophile to perform catalysis. The threonine must be N-terminal since the terminal amine of the same residue acts as a general base by polarising an ordered water which deprotonates the alcohol to increase its reactivity as a nucleophile.

Catalysis takes place in two steps:
 Firstly the nucleophile attacks the substrate to form a covalent acyl-enzyme intermediate, releasing the first product.
 Secondly the intermediate is hydrolysed by water to regenerate the free enzyme and release the second product.
 In ornithine acyltransferase, instead of water, the substrate ornithine (the acceptor) performs the second nucleophilic attack and so leaves with the acyl group.

Classification and evolution

Five families belonging to two separate superfamilies are currently recognised: the Ntn fold proteosomes (superfamily PB) and the DOM fold ornithine acyltransferases (superfamily PE). The two superfamilies represent two independent, convergent evolutions of the same active site.

See also 

Protease
serine-
cysteine-
aspartic-
metallo-
Enzyme
Proteolysis
Catalytic triad
Convergent evolution
The Proteolysis Map
Protease inhibitor (pharmacology)
Protease inhibitor (biology)
TopFIND - database of protease specificity, substrates, products and inhibitors  
MEROPS - database of protease evolutionary groups

References 

Proteases
EC 3.4